Spider wrap is a type of security device used by many retailers. It is a wired alarm that is attached to products to prevent theft. If the wire is cut, the alarm sounds.

References

American inventions
Security technology